The Women's Foreign Player of the Year is an award for the top-tier basketball league in Iceland, the women's Úrvalsdeild.

All-time award winners
The following is a list of the all-time Úrvalsdeild Women's Foreign Player of the Year winners.

 Penny Peppas and Ulrike Hettler were the only foreign players during the 1996-1997 season. Peppas became the first foreign born professional player in the Úrvalsdeild kvenna in 1994.

References

External links
Icelandic Basketball Federation Official Website 

Úrvalsdeild kvenna (basketball)
European basketball awards